Isabella Cecil, Marchioness of Exeter (6 March 1803 – 6 March 1879), formerly Isabella Poyntz, was the wife of Brownlow Cecil, 2nd Marquess of Exeter, and the mother of the 3rd Marquess.

Biography 
She was the daughter of William Stephen Poyntz, a Liberal MP, and his wife, the former Hon. Elizabeth Mary Browne. Isabella's sister, Elizabeth Georgina Poyntz, married Frederick Spencer, 4th Earl Spencer. Another sister, Frances Selina Isabella Poyntz, married Robert Cotton St. John Trefusis, 18th Baron Clinton, and, on his death, married Sir Horace Seymour, MP. Two of their brothers were drowned in an accident in a boating accident in 1815.

The Poyntz family had homes at Midgham House in Berkshire and Cowdray Park in West Sussex.

Children 
Isabella married the marquess in London on 12 May 1824. Their children were:

 Lady Mary Frances Cecil (died 1917), who married Dudley Francis Stuart Ryder, 3rd Earl of Harrowby, and had no children
 William Alleyne Cecil, 3rd Marquess of Exeter (1825-1895)
 Colonel Lord Brownlow Thomas Montagu Cecil (1827-1905)
 Commander Lord Edward Cecil (1834-1862)
 Lord Adelbert Percy Cecil (1841–1889), who was a member of the Plymouth Brethren and died, unmarried, in Canada 
 Lady Victoria Cecil (1843-1932), who married William Charles Evans-Freke, 8th Baron Carbery, and had children

The marquess died in 1867. Isabella died in 1879, aged 76, and was buried with her husband in the Cecil family chapel at St Martin's Church, Stamford.

References

1803 births
1879 deaths
British marchionesses